Danny Fuller is the name of:
Danny Fuller (EastEnders), a character in UK TV series EastEnders
Danny Fuller (surfer) (born 1982), American surfer
The second Kid Supreme, character in comic book Supreme